Warren Garton Joyce (born 20 January 1965) is an English football manager and former player, who is currently the lead coach of Nottingham Forest F.C.'s U18 Squad.

As a player, he played in The Football League for Bolton Wanderers, Preston North End, Plymouth Argyle, Burnley and Hull City. After taking over as player-manager of Hull City in 1998, he eventually moved to Belgium, where he was appointed manager of Manchester United's feeder club Royal Antwerp in 2006.

Two years later, he returned to England as co-manager of the Manchester United reserves, along with former Manchester United forward Ole Gunnar Solskjær. When Solskjær left in 2011, Joyce took charge of the reserves. In November 2016, he was signed by Wigan Athletic as a replacement for Gary Caldwell, but left four months later. In June 2017, Joyce was announced as the new manager for Melbourne City in the A-League. On 8 May 2019, Melbourne City announced they had severed ties with Joyce.

In June 2019, he became the Development coach with League Two side Salford City, spending two years with the Ammies before taking on the role of lead U18 coach with Nottingham Forest in July 2021.

Playing career

Bolton Wanderers
Joyce was born in Oldham, Lancashire, the son of Walter Joyce, the former Burnley, Blackburn Rovers and Oldham Athletic player, and began his career as a trainee with Bolton Wanderers in 1981. He broke into the first team as a midfielder and in six years made a total of 221 appearances for Bolton, scoring 21 goals.

Preston North End
In October 1987, however, Preston North End manager John McGrath offered £35,000 for his services. With Joyce's father Walter now a coach at Deepdale (he had previously coached at Oldham Athletic), Joyce decided to make the move.

Over the next five years, he became a popular figure at Preston earning himself the nickname "Psycho", due to his never-say-die commitment to the cause. In all he played 208 matches for the Lilywhites scoring 44 goals, winning the club's player of the year award and being made club captain. However, when Plymouth Argyle made a £160,000 offer for him in May 1992, Preston were forced to accept and he was on his way to Home Park.

Plymouth Argyle and Burnley
His stay in Devon was short, with Joyce playing only 40 games and scoring four goals in his year there.  When Burnley offered £140,000 for him in July 1993 Plymouth decided to cash in, he was on his way back to Lancashire. In three years at Turf Moor he played 90 games and scored 12 goals.

Hull City
A loan stay though at Hull City in January 1995 paved the way for a permanent deal 18 months later, and in July 1996 Joyce signed for Hull. He went on to play a total of 170 games for Hull scoring 19 goals, becoming club captain at Boothferry Park. Later in November 1998 he was asked to stand in as caretaker manager following the departure of Mark Hateley.

City soon made the appointment permanent with Joyce taking on the dual role of player-manager. At the time of his appointment, City were rooted to the foot of the 4th Division table and looked to be heading out of the Football League – and into bankruptcy. However, under Joyce's stewardship, City staged a remarkable turnaround and achieved survival with games to spare; City fans christened this season "the Great Escape".

Coaching and managerial career
Hull City's chairman decided to replace Joyce as manager with the more experienced and well-known Brian Little.

In all, Joyce's playing career spanned 19 years scoring 100 goals in 731 appearances for his various clubs. He has since held coaching roles with Leeds United, Stockport County and Tranmere Rovers.

On 11 September 2006, Joyce was appointed coach of Royal Antwerp. He was introduced to this team by his former colleague Andy Welsh who was the assistant coach at Royal Antwerp on a loan basis from Manchester United. On 26 May 2008, it was announced that Joyce would leave Antwerp for Manchester United, where he would be co-managing the reserves along with former United striker Ole Gunnar Solskjær. He took sole charge in December 2010, when Solskjær left to manage Molde FK.

On 2 November 2016, Joyce was appointed manager of Championship club Wigan Athletic on a three-and-a-half-year contract. However, after managing just 6 wins out of 24 matches, he parted company with Wigan on 13 March 2017, four months after first joining the club.

On 19 June 2017, Joyce was announced as the new manager of Australian A-League club Melbourne City.

In July 2019 he was appointed as coach for Salford City's first development squad.

Since the summer of 2021, he has been in his current role with Forest, replacing Gareth Holmes in the role of lead u18 coach.

Managerial statistics

References

External links

1965 births
Living people
Footballers from Oldham
English footballers
Association football midfielders
Bolton Wanderers F.C. players
Preston North End F.C. players
Plymouth Argyle F.C. players
Burnley F.C. players
Hull City A.F.C. players
English Football League players
English football managers
Hull City A.F.C. managers
Royal Antwerp F.C. managers
Wigan Athletic F.C. managers
English Football League managers
Tranmere Rovers F.C. non-playing staff
Manchester United F.C. non-playing staff
Salford City F.C. non-playing staff
Nottingham Forest F.C. non-playing staff